Pothyne trivittata is a species of beetle in the family Cerambycidae. It was described by Newman in 1842.

References

trivittata
Beetles described in 1842